The 1955 Meath Senior Football Championship is the 63rd edition of the Meath GAA's premier club Gaelic football tournament for senior graded teams in County Meath, Ireland. The tournament consists of 11 teams. The championship employs a group stage followed by a final between the group winners.

This season saw Ballinlough's debut in the top flight after claiming the 1954 Meath Intermediate Football Championship title. Fordstown also made their debut in the grade after claiming the 1954 J.F.C. title.

Skryne were the defending champions after they defeated Kells Harps in the previous years final, however they lost their crown by failing to progress past the group stages.

St. Vincent's claimed their 1st S.F.C. title by defeating Kells Harps in the final at Pairc Tailteann by 1-12 to 2-3 on 23 October 1955. Kevin Mooney raised the Keegan Cup for the Dublin border side. This was the first match to be played in a renovated Pairc Tailteann.

At the end of the season, newly promoted side Fordstown were regraded to the 1956 I.F.C.

Team Changes

The following teams have changed division since the 1954 championship season.

To S.F.C.
Promoted from 1954 I.F.C.
 Ballinlough - (Intermediate Champions).

Promoted from 1954 J.F.C.
 Fordstown - (Junior Champions).

From S.F.C.
Regraded to 1955 I.F.C.
 Dunshaughlin
 Oldcastle
 St. Patrick's

Group A

Round 1:
 Donaghmore 2-4, 1-5 Trim, Pairc Tailteann, 5/6/1955,
 Skryne 1-16, 1-4 St. Peter's Dunboyne, Trim, 5/6/1955,
 St. Vincent's - Bye,

Round 2:
 St. Vincent's 0-12, 0-8 Donaghmore, Skryne, 24/6/1955,
 Skryne 2-8, 4-2 Trim, Pairc Tailteann, 17/7/1955,
 St. Peter's Dunboyne - Bye,

Round 3:
 Trim w, l St. Peter's Dunboyne, Drumree, 14/8/1955,
 St. Vincent's w, l Skryne, Ashbourne, 14/8/1955,
 Donaghmore - Bye,

Round 4:
 St. Vincent's 2-9, 2-3 Trim, Skryne, 28/8/1955,
 St. Peter's Dunboyne 0-9, 0-5 Donaghmore, Drumree, 28/8/1955,
 Skryne - Bye,

Round 5:
 St. Vincent's w, l St. Peter's Dunboyne, Skryne, 9/10/1955,
 Skryne -vs- Donaghmore, 
 Trim - Bye,

Group B

Round 1:
 Navan O'Mahonys 2-10, 0-4 Syddan, Kells, 6/3/1955,
 Ballinlough 1-8, 1-3 Kells Harps, Kells, 1/5/1955,
 Ballivor -vs- Fordstown,

Round 2:
 Navan O'Mahonys 1-9, 0-4 Fordstown, Kells, 15/5/1955,
 Ballinlough 3-7, 0-6 Syddan, Pairc Tailteann, 5/6/1955,
 Kells Harps 1-9, 0-4 Ballivor, Athboy, 5/6/1955,

Round 3:
 Syddan 2-3, 1-3 Ballivor, Pairc Tailteann, 26/6/1955,
 Kells Harps 4-7, 1-3 Fordstown, Kilskyre, 10/7/1955,
 Navan O'Mahonys 1-11, 2-6 Ballinlough, Kells, 17/7/1955,

Round 4:
 Fordstown 1-8, 1-3 Syddan, Pairc Tailteann, 17/7/1955,
 Ballinlough 0-8, 1-3 Ballivor, Athboy, 14/8/1955,
 Kells Harps 0-7, 0-6 Navan O'Mahonys, Trim, 28/8/1955,

Round 5:
 Ballinlough 2-10, 0-4 Fordstown, Kells, 28/8/1955,
 Kells Harps w/o, scr Syddan, Kilmainhamwood, 4/9/1955,
 Navan O'Mahonys -vs- Ballivor,

Final Play-offs:
 Kells Harps 0-11, 0-10 Ballinlough, Kells, 9/10/1955,

Final

 St. Vincent's 1-12, 2-3 Kells Harps, Pairc Tailteann, 23/10/1955,

References

External links

Meath Senior Football Championship
Meath Senior Football Championship